The Dharawal people, also spelt Tharawal and other variants, are an Aboriginal Australian people, identified by the Dharawal language. Traditionally, they lived as hunter–fisher–gatherers in family groups or clans with ties of kinship, scattered along the coastal area of what is now the Sydney basin in New South Wales.

Etymology
Dharawal means cabbage palm.

Country
Their inland extent reaches Campbelltown and Camden.

Clans
The Gweagal were also known as the "Fire Clan". They are said to be the first people to first make contact with Captain Cook. The artist Sydney Parkinson, one of the Endeavour's crew members, wrote in his journal that the indigenous people threatened them shouting words he transcribed as warra warra wai, which he glossed to signify 'Go away'. According to spokesmen for the contemporary Dharawal community, the meaning was rather 'You are all dead', since warra is a root in the Dharawal language meaning 'wither', 'white' or 'dead'. As Cook's ship hove to near the foreshore, it appeared to the Dharwal to be a white low-lying cloud, and its crew 'dead' people whom they warned off from returning to the country.

The Cubbitch Barta clan registered an Indigenous land use agreement for Helensburgh in 2011.

Lifestyle
The whale is the main totem for the Dharawal people. The historical artwork (rock engravings) of the Dharawal people is visible on the sandstone surfaces throughout their language area and charcoal and ochre paintings, drawings and hand stencils can be found on hundreds of rock surfaces and in the many dozens of rock shelters and overhangs in that area of land. There is a public viewing site of one group of engravings at Jibbon Point, showing a whale and a wallaby, celebrating successful hunts and whale strandings. Those engravings are marred by recent European inclusions. The original Jibbon point engravings (pecked and abraided petroglyphs) show a pod of killer whales hunting a seal.

It has been claimed that there were no remaining descendants of the Dharawal people; however, after the Mabo v Queensland verdict and the Native Title Act 1993 there have been claims lodged by descendants of the Wodiwodi clan who claim to have survived the early decimations and gradually moved back into the areas formally occupied by other clans. These Wodi Wodi clansmen are claiming lineage to the Dharawal tribe. Others claim descent from the Gweagal clan.

The Dharawal people lived mainly by the produce of local plants, fruits and vegetables and by fishing and gathering shellfish products. The men also hunted land mammals and speared fish.  The women collected the vegetable foods and were well known for their fishing and canoeing prowess.  There are a large number of shell middens still visible in the areas around the southern Sydney area and a glimpse of the Dharawal lifestyle can be drawn from an understanding of the kitchen rubbish left on the midden sites.

Alternative names

 Carawal. (Pacific islands phonetic system, c had the value of th)
 Darawad
 Ta-ga-ry. (tagara = north)
 Thurawal
 Thurrawal
 Thurrawall
 Turawal
 Turrubul
 Turuwal
 Turuwul
 Turuwull

Source:

See also
 Eora
 Gweagal

Notes

Citations

Sources

Further reading

 (Trove and Worldcat entries)

External links
 
 Local Aboriginal Land Council on Facebook

Aboriginal peoples of New South Wales